The Lao People's Navy (LPN) is the navy of Laos. In 1975 the Lao People's Navy (LPN) was established with the remnants of the Royal Lao Navy. The Lao People's Navy operates vessels on the Mekong River, a major feature of the country's geography.  Because the Mekong makes up a considerable portion of the Lao border, the Navy is significantly involved in border control work. The navy as of the mid-1990s had a personnel strength of around 500 and around fifty river patrol boats.

Almost all officers of the Lao People's Navy were trained in the Vietnam Naval Academy.

Fleet

See also
Lao People's Army
Lao People's Liberation Army Air Force

References

External links

Military of Laos
Riverine warfare